The events of 2002 in anime.

Events
February 7 - Manglobe is created

Accolades  
At the Mainichi Film Awards, Crayon Shin-chan: The Storm Called: The Battle of the Warring States won the Animation Film Award and Millennium Actress won the Ōfuji Noburō Award. Internationally, Spirited Away became the first, and so far only, anime to win both the Academy Award for Best Animated Feature and the Annie Award for Best Animated Feature. Kōji Yamamura's Mt. Head was nominated for the Academy Award for Best Animated Short Film. Spirited Away also won the New York Film Critics Circle Award for Best Animated Film.

Releases

Films

Television series

Original video animations

See also
2002 in animation

External links 
Japanese animated works of the year, listed in the IMDb

Years in anime
2002 in animation
2002 in Japan